In Therapy is a British television reality series broadcast on Channel 5, in which therapist Mandy Saligari talks with various celebrities. The programme ran for three series from 2015 to 2020.

Episodes

Series 1 (2015–17)

Series 2 (2017)

Series 3 (2017–20)

2015 British television series debuts
2018 British television series endings
2010s British reality television series
Channel 5 (British TV channel) reality television shows
English-language television shows
Television shows set in London